Toronto slang is the slang or informal vocabulary used within Canadian English of the Greater Toronto Area, particularly by younger working-class people in inner-city Toronto: an area known for its multicultural diverse population and Caribbean influences. It is spoken specifically within the Greater Toronto Area, Hamilton, Barrie, and Ottawa. To a lesser extent, these variants have emerged in other diverse neighbourhoods and urban Canadian cities as well, which include parts of Montréal, Calgary, and Edmonton.

History 
The origin of unique Toronto vocabulary goes all the way back to its widespread migration from the Caribbean to Canada in the 1960s and 1970s, when the vast majority of people from places such as Jamaica, Trinidad, Barbados, and other Caribbean islands, as well as Guyana had largely migrated to Toronto and other parts of the region. People have also migrated to Canada from West Africa, East Africa, South Asia, and Southeast Asia.

Vocabulary 

Here is a list of common words in Greater Toronto English:

Adjectives 
"Bare" (very/a lot/many)
"Bait" (sketchy/dangerous)
"Beat" (something that looks ugly, can be used to describe an object) 
"Cheesed" (pissed, mad, angry)
"Dutty" (dirty, bad, ugly)
"Dry" (uncool, lame, boring, uninterested)
"Greezy" (something impressive or attractive in a fashionable use)
"Likkle" (Jamaican patois word from the English word "little")
"Marved" (starving)
"Merked" (ugly, unattractive)
"Mod" (bad/crazy)
"Peng" (describes a person who is attractive)
"Soft" (a person who is weak, scared, or afraid)
"Sweeterman/Sweeter-ting” (a person with sweet personalities and good looks)

Interjections 
"Ahlie!" (expression to agree with something or "am I lying?" The term also appears in Multicultural London English (MLE))
"Are you dumb?" (to describe someone who behaves stupidly and completely idiotically)
"Bless up!" (expression of greeting or farewell)
"Dun Know" (another way of saying "you already know," "of course," or "I know")
"Holy!" (often used when a person needs to chill out or to stop doing too much)
"Jokes!" ("that's jokes!", compliments something funny or hilarious)
"Wagwan" (an equivalent greeting to "what's up" or "what's going on?") 
"Wallahi" (an Arabic word meaning to swear to god)
"What you sayin?" ("what you up to?" used as an expression of greeting)

Pronouns 
 "Mans" or sometimes "man-dem" (I/me/you/people; first-person singular is the most notable usage) 
Mans in 21st-century Toronto English has gained special attention in being applied as a variety of personal pronouns, including (most notably) as a first-person singular pronoun (like I or me), a second-person singular pronoun (like you), or an indefinite pronoun (similar to people or folks). A plural-conjugated verb is required with the use of mans; for example: "Mans are ready" can mean "I am ready", "you are ready", or "people are ready". "What are mans saying?" can mean "What am I saying?", "What are you saying?", or "What are people saying?". The similar usage of man as a pronoun is common in Multicultural London English (MLE), but mans as a singular pronoun is exclusively Torontonian; the two terms likely developed in parallel timeframes, but not with one dialect directly affecting the other. It is likely that both usages ultimately come from man with a Jamaican Patois or other Caribbean Creole origin, though no Creole uses mans in this exact way. The process of this pronoun emerging from the original noun, man(s), has been happening in Toronto since roughly 2005 to the present.
 "You" (second-person singular)
 "You mans" (you, plural)
 "My mans" (third-person singular, masculine)
 "My guy" (close friend or acquaintance)
 "Them/dem-mans/man-dem" (them)
 "Us mans" (we)

Nouns 
"6ix" (slang term for both the area code (416 and 647), also stands for the six pre-merger governments in Toronto)
"Blem" (a cigarette, marijuana, or joint, also used to describe someone who is extremely high)
"Bucktee/bean" (someone who is a crackhead or acts stupidly)
"Crib" (someone's place of residence)
"Cro/crodie" (crip version of 'bro/brodie' but usually refers to a friend)
"Cronem" (group of 'cros', crip version of 'bronem', and refers to a group of friends)
"Cyattie" (describes a female who is being loud and obnoxious)
"Deafaz" (giving a hard physical slap or punch to someone)
"Dukes" (slang term for parents)
"Cuzzo" (cousin)
"Ends" (area, or neighbourhood)
 "Fam" (short for "family" but generally used to refer to a "friend")
 ”Fawad” (Jamaican patois word meaning to come or to go somewhere)
 "Gyal" (girl)
 "Gyallis" (a guy who can pick up ladies easily"
 "Gyaldem" (group of girls)
 "Hoodman" (a young working-class person involved in crime and drugs, similar to the equivalent word "roadman" used in MLE)
 "Mandem" (a group of males or male friends)
 "Side ting" (sexual partner other than a girlfriend/wife)
 "Snake" (an untrustworthy person)
 ”Stain” (getting robbed)
 "Styll" (pronounced "still" and means agree to someone or the truth and is occasionally used at the last part of a statement)
 "T-Dot" (abbreviation word for "Toronto")
 "Telly" (slang for a hotel or a hotel room)
 "Ting" (a thing but usually refers to an attractive female)
 "Two-Four" (refers to a case of 24 pack beers) This noun is not unique to Toronto but is used across Canada.
 "Wasteman/wasteyute)" (a worthless, garbage, insensible idiotic person who makes bad decisions with their life, both words being used interchangeably)
 "Two-Twos" (unexpectedly or quickly)
 "Wifey" (girlfriend, or wife)
 ”Wozzles” (giving blowjob)
 "Yute" (Patois word from English "youth")

Verbs 
 "Allow/Lowe it/that" (to ignore, forget or not bother with)
 "Ball up" (smoking marijuana)
 "Beef" (argument, fight)
 "Buss" (to give/to send, to bust, or to ejaculate)
 "Flex" (to show off such as money and clothes)
 "Link (up)" (to meet up, give someone something, pre-relationship status)
 "Nize it/that" (to tell someone to shut up or stop talking)
 "Pree" (to pay and look close attention to)
 "Reach/come thru" (synonyms for "come by" or "attend")
 "Scoop me" (to get a ride somewhere, get picked up)
 "Scrap" (to fight)
 "Y-pree" (patois word, meaning "what's up?" or to mind your own: "why are you in my business?")

Controversy 
The article on VICE, dated October 21, 2019, by Sharine Taylor, featured a CityNews article, "New Toronto slang growing in popularity," and has sparked controversy within the community, which stated that it failed to represent Toronto slang. Following up, she stated the problem is the slangs are not "new," as the title had implied, and belong not to Toronto but to Black communities within Toronto, which were notably absent, as mentioned previously, from the coverage.

On May 17, 2016, Max Weinstein wrote an XXL article explaining the Twitter controversy surrounding Drake's usage of Jamaican Patois because of his failure to acknowledge Toronto slang and its origin. Another writer, Sajae Elder, wrote a similar article on BuzzFeed News.

In popular culture 

 In 2017, Drake was featured in a Toronto-based comedy show called (T-Dot Goon Scrap DVD 2), where he spoke using many Toronto slang terms.
 In a Vanity Fair YouTube video, Shawn Mendes, a popular Canadian singer and songwriter, was featured, teaching about Canadian slang (primarily Toronto slang vocabulary).

See also 

 Canadian English
 Greater Toronto Area
 Toronto
 Multicultural London English
 Multiethnolect
 Sociolect

References

Languages attested from the 20th century
Canadian English
Greater Toronto Area
English
City colloquials
English language in Canada
Multiculturalism in Canada
Working-class culture in Canada